Melvin L. Oliver is an American academic administrator and professor serving as the sixth president of Pitzer College. He is the first African American to become president of one of the Claremont Colleges.

Early life and education 
Oliver was born in Pittsburgh, Pennsylvania in 1950, and raised in Cleveland, Ohio. Oliver earned his Bachelor of Arts at William Penn University and his Master of Arts and PhD from Washington University in St. Louis.

Career 
Oliver served as the executive dean at the UCSB College of Letters and Science, where he was also the Sara Miller McCune Dean of Social Sciences and a professor of sociology. In addition to his career in academics, Oliver has served as the vice president of the Asset Building and Community Development Program at the Ford Foundation. Oliver worked as a professor of sociology at the University of California, Los Angeles from 1978 to 1996, and helped establish the UCLA Center for the Study of Urban Poverty.

Oliver's tenure at Pitzer included the controversial vetoing of a vote to suspend the college's study abroad program at the University of Haifa to protest Israel's occupation of the West Bank.

On February 3, Oliver announced his plans to retire from his post as the president of Pitzer College at the end of the 2021-2022 academic year.

References 

Living people
American sociologists
1950 births
Washington University in St. Louis alumni
William Penn University alumni
Heads of universities and colleges in the United States
African-American academics
Presidents of Pitzer College